Stephen Mark "Steve" Saleen (born April 2, 1949) is an American businessman and former racing driver.  He is best known for being the founder and former vice chairman of Saleen, Inc., originally named Saleen Autosport, which is an OEM manufacturer of specialty vehicles including the Saleen S1, Saleen S7 and highly modified Ford Mustangs.

Biography
Born in Inglewood, California, and a 1967 graduate of Whittier High School in Whittier, California,  Saleen (pronounced suh-lean) worked at his father's manufacturing business before attending the University of Southern California and graduating with a degree in business.

With an interest in fast cars sparked by his father's purchase of a Porsche, Steve joined the Porsche Owners Club and worked his way up through the ranks of club racing, which led to a career in professional racing.  He entered the Formula Atlantic series where, in 1980, he finished third in the final standings behind eventual champion Jacques Villeneuve.  He progressed on to the SCCA Trans-Am Series in 1982, driving a Ford Mustang.  From here, a passion for one of Ford's most famous automobiles begin to manifest itself.

Saleen formed Saleen Autosport in 1983 and set to building the first Saleen Mustang, equipped with special aerodynamic, suspension and handling packages and a completely redesigned interior.  The car was completed in 1984 and was immediately tested against the world's top sports cars with great success, finishing first in its class at the Mosport 24-hour race that year.

In 1995, Saleen formed a race team with comedian Tim Allen and fellow race driver Bob Bondurant, called Saleen/Allen "RRR" Speedlab (the name "RRR" was a play on Allen's "arr arr arr" grunt which had become his trademark in both stand-up comedy and on his television show, Home Improvement).  The team raced Saleen Mustangs in the SCCA World Challenge, with Saleen and Allen themselves as the drivers.

In 1996, Saleen was (along with Carroll Shelby) inducted into the  Mustang Hall of Fame.

In March 2007 Steve Saleen resigned from Saleen, Inc. the company he founded in 1984, to pursue other business opportunities in the automotive sector.

On March 13, 2008 Steve Saleen announced the formation of "SMS Supercars ", Lifestyle Performance Automobiles.  Through the years of building the reputation behind each automotive company brand, Saleen maintained close participation throughout product development, sales and marketing. He announced that the focus of SMS is with the high-end of the American Muscle Car and Global Supercar markets.  In April 2009, Saleen announced that SMS Supercars will voluntarily honor the warranties of vehicles manufactured by the now-defunct Saleen, Inc.

Nearly 5 years after resigning from Saleen, Inc., on April 2, 2012 Steve Saleen announced that he is once again associated with the Saleen automotive brand.

In August 2020, Steve claimed Chinese government of Jiangsu Province - Rugao filed his 500+ patent without consent and he was ripped off in the intellectual property battle during his JV business in China. The article was published on WSJ.

Personal life
Saleen lives in Southern California, with his wife Elizabeth ("Liz").  Saleen has three adult children and seven grandchildren.

Motorsports career

SCCA National Championship Runoffs

IndyCar/CART

24 Hours of Le Mans results

References

http://www.saleenclubofamerica.com/SCOATech/images/Early_Magazine/HotRod-April-1986.pdf

External links

 Saleen Site
 SMS Supercars Site 

1949 births
American racing drivers
American automobile designers
American founders of automobile manufacturers
Champ Car drivers
Atlantic Championship drivers
Trans-Am Series drivers
Marshall School of Business alumni
Living people
24 Hours of Le Mans drivers
Sportspeople from Inglewood, California
American Le Mans Series drivers
Racing drivers from California
Racing drivers from Los Angeles
SCCA Formula Super Vee drivers
SCCA National Championship Runoffs participants
People from Coto de Caza, California
Automotive businesspeople